Philippe Antoine d'Ornano, 1st Comte d'Ornano (January 17, 1784 – October 13, 1863) was a French soldier and political figure who rose to the rank of Marshal of France. He was made Count d'Ornano of the French Empire in 1808. He was born a son of Lodovico Antonio Ornano and Isabella Maria Buonaparte, making him a second cousin of Napoleon Bonaparte.

Life

Revolution and First Empire
Born in Ajaccio, Corsica, he served in Italy during the French Revolutionary Wars (in 1798 and 1799), and later took part in the expedition to Saint-Domingue. D'Ornano served in the campaigns of the Napoleonic Wars from 1805 on. He commanded the 5th Dragoon regiment during the battle of Fuentes de Oñoro, after a brave attack of cavalry, he was promoted to brigadier general.

He returned to France and took part in the Russian campaign of 1812. At the Battle of Borodino, d'Ornano was promoted to général de division. D'Ornano was wounded at the Battle of Krasnoi.

In 1813, after the death of Marshal Jean-Baptiste Bessières, he commanded the cavalry of the Imperial Guard. He accompanied Napoleon to the south of France until the emperor embarked for Elba, and was exiled from France by the Bourbon Restoration.

In 1816, d'Ornano married countess Marie Walewska, who for years did belong to the inner circles of Napoleon - she died in childbirth in 1817. Her heart was placed in the crypt of the d'Ornano family at Père Lachaise Cemetery in Paris and her body was brought back to Poland for burial. In 1869, however, her coffin was found to be empty. It was speculated that some unknown necrophile had removed her remains.

The line of Counts d'Ornano was continued by his only son Rodolphe-Auguste d'Ornano, and exists until the present day.

Restoration, July Monarchy, and Second Empire

He returned to France and resumed active service in 1829 when he was given a position at the Military Academy of Saint-Cyr. In 1830, after the July Revolution, he was given command of the 4th military division at Tours. Two years later, he suppressed revolts in the Vendée after which he was made a Peer of France. In 1848 he served as head of the 14th military division until he resigned for reasons of health.

In 1849, d'Ornano was elected to the National Assembly as a member for the département of Indre-et-Loire. During the Second Empire, he was made a Senator and a Grand Cross in the Légion d'honneur. After the death of Rémy Joseph Isidore Exelmans, he was appointed Chancellor of the order. In 1853 he was made Governor of Les Invalides. At the age of seventy seven, he was promoted to Marshal of France by Napoléon III. He died in Vincennes, a suburb of Paris, in 1863.

Ancestry

References
 Biographie Gėnėrale, Tome 38, Paris 1862
 Antoine Philippe Comte d'Ornano, Marie Walewska, "l'ėpouse polonaise de Napolėon", Paris 1937

1784 births
1863 deaths
Politicians from Ajaccio
Burials at Père Lachaise Cemetery
Counts of the First French Empire
French military personnel of the French Revolutionary Wars
French commanders of the Napoleonic Wars
Grand Croix of the Légion d'honneur
Grand Chanceliers of the Légion d'honneur
Marshals of France
Members of the Chamber of Peers of the July Monarchy
Names inscribed under the Arc de Triomphe
Military personnel from Ajaccio